Naked Lunch (sometimes The Naked Lunch) is a 1959 novel by American writer William S. Burroughs. The book is structured as a series of loosely connected vignettes, intended by Burroughs to be read in any order. The reader follows the narration of junkie William Lee, who takes on various aliases, from the U.S. to Mexico, eventually to Tangier and the dreamlike Interzone.

The vignettes (which Burroughs called "routines") are drawn from Burroughs' own experiences in these places and his addiction to drugs: heroin, morphine and, while in Tangier, majoun (a strong hashish confection), as well as a German opioid with the brand name Eukodol (oxycodone), of which he wrote frequently.

The novel was included in Time's "100 Best English-language Novels from 1923 to 2005". In 1991, David Cronenberg wrote and directed a film of the same name based on the novel and other Burroughs writings.

Title origin
The book was originally published with the title The Naked Lunch in Paris in July 1959 by Olympia Press. Because of US obscenity laws, a complete American edition (by Grove Press) did not follow until 1962. It was titled Naked Lunch and was substantially different from the Olympia Press edition because it was based on an earlier 1958 manuscript in Allen Ginsberg's possession. The definite article "the" in the title was never intended by the author, but added by the editors of the Olympia Press 1959 edition. Nonetheless The Naked Lunch remained the title used for the 1968 and 1974 Corgi Books editions, and the novel is often known by the alternative name, especially in the UK where these editions circulated.

Burroughs wrote in his introduction that Jack Kerouac suggested the title. "The title means exactly what the words say: naked lunch, a frozen moment when everyone sees what is on the end of every fork.  Although scholarly research tends to point toward Manet's Le Déjeuner sur l'herbe (The Luncheon on the Grass) of 1863 as Burroughs' inspiration for the title.

In a June 1960 letter to Ginsberg, Kerouac wrote that he was pleased that Burroughs had credited him with the title, writing that Ginsberg misread "Naked Lust" from the manuscript, and only he noticed. Kerouac did not specify which manuscript, and critics could only speculate until 2003 when Burroughs scholar Oliver Harris established that, in his Lower East Side apartment in fall 1953, Ginsberg had been reading aloud to Kerouac from the manuscript of Queer, which Burroughs had just brought with him from Mexico City. For the next five years, Burroughs used the title to refer to a three-part work made up of "Junk", "Queer" and "Yage", corresponding to his first three manuscripts, before it came to describe the book later published as Naked Lunch, which was based largely on his 1957 "Interzone" manuscript.

Editions
Upon publication, Grove Press added to the book supplementary material regarding the censorship battle as well as an article written by Burroughs on the topic of drug addiction. In 2001, a "restored text" edition of Naked Lunch was published with some new and previously suppressed material added.

Plot summary
Naked Lunch is a non-linear narrative without a clear plot. The following is a summary of some of the events in the book that could be considered the most relevant.

The book begins with the adventures of William Lee (also known as "Lee the Agent"), who is Burroughs' alter ego in the novel. His journey starts in the U.S. where he is fleeing the police in search of his next fix. There are short chapters describing the different characters he travels with and meets along the way.

Eventually he gets to Mexico where he is assigned to Dr. Benway; for what, he is not told.  Benway appears and he tells about his previous doings in Annexia as a "Total Demoralizator".  The story then moves to a state called Freeland, a form of limbo, where we learn of Islam Inc. Here, some new characters are introduced, such as Clem, Carl, and Joselito.

A short section then jumps in space and time to a marketplace. The Black Meat is sold here and compared to "junk", i.e. heroin. The action then moves back to the hospital where Benway is fully revealed as a manipulative sadist.

Time and space again shift the narrative to a location known as Interzone. Hassan, one of the notable characters of the book and "a notorious liquefactionist", is throwing a violent orgy. AJ crashes the party and wreaks havoc, decapitating people and imitating a pirate. Hassan is enraged and tells AJ never to return, calling him a "factualist bitch", a term which is enlarged much later when the apparently "clashing" political factions within Interzone are described. These include the Liquefactionists, the Senders, the Factualists, and the Divisionists (who occupy "a midway position"). A short descriptive section tells of Interzone University, where a professor and his students are ridiculed; the book moves on to an orgy that AJ throws.

The book then shifts back to the market place and a description of the totalitarian government of Annexia. Characters including the County Clerk, Benway, Dr. Berger, Clem and Jody are sketched through heavy dialogue and their own sub-stories.

After the description of the four parties of Interzone, we are told more stories about AJ. After briefly describing Interzone, the novel breaks into sub-stories and heavily cut-up influenced passages.

In a sudden return to what seems to be Lee's reality, two police officers, Hauser and O'Brien, catch up with Lee, who kills both of them. Lee then goes out to a street phone booth and calls the Narcotics Squad, saying he wants to speak to O'Brien. A Lieutenant Gonzales on the other end of the line claims there's no one in their records called O'Brien. When Lee asks for Hauser instead, the reply is identical; Lee hangs up, and goes on the run once again. The book then becomes increasingly disjointed and impressionistic, and finally simply stops.

Literary significance and reception
Naked Lunch is considered Burroughs' seminal work. Extremely controversial in both its subject matter and its use of obscene language (something Burroughs recognized and intended), the book was banned in Boston and Los Angeles in the United States, and several European publishers were harassed. It was one of the more recent American books over which an obscenity trial has been held.

The book was banned in Boston in 1962 due to obscenity (notably child murder and acts of pedophilia), making it among the last works to be banned in that city, but that decision was reversed in 1966 by the Massachusetts Supreme Judicial Court. The Appeals Court found the book did not violate obscenity statutes, as it was found to have some social value. The hearing included testimony in support of the work by Allen Ginsberg and Norman Mailer.

Sections of the manuscript were published in the Spring 1958 edition of Robert Creeley's Black Mountain Review and in the Spring 1958 edition of the University of Chicago student-run publication Chicago Review. The student edition was not well received, and caused the university administration to discuss the future censorship of the Winter 1959 edition of the publication, resulting in the resignation of all but one of the editors.

On a more specific level, Naked Lunch also protests the death penalty. In Burroughs's "Deposition: A Testimony Concerning A Sickness", "The Blue Movies" (appearing in the vignette "A.J.'s Annual Party") is deemed "a tract against capital punishment."

Fans of Beat Generation literature, Donald Fagen and Walter Becker named their band Steely Dan after a "revolutionary" steam-powered dildo mentioned in the novel.

Film adaptation

From the 1960s, numerous film-makers considered adapting Naked Lunch for the screen. Antony Balch, who worked with Burroughs on a number of short film projects in 1960s, considered making a musical with Mick Jagger in the lead role, but the project fell through when relationships soured between Balch and Jagger. Burroughs himself adapted his book for the never-made film; after Jagger dropped out, Dennis Hopper was considered for the lead role, and at one point game-show producer Chuck Barris was considered a possible financier of the project.

In May 1991, rather than attempting a straight adaptation, Canadian director David Cronenberg took a few elements from the book and combined them with elements of Burroughs' life, creating a hybrid film about the writing of the book rather than the book itself. Peter Weller starred as William Lee, the pseudonym Burroughs used when he wrote Junkie.

Comic book adaptation
Italian comics artist Gianluca Lerici, better known under his artistic pseudonym Professor Bad Trip, adapted the novel into a graphic novel titled Il Pasto Nudo (1992), published by Shake Edizioni.

Audio versions
Unabridged readings of both the original text and the Restored Text edition have been made available through services such as Audible. Burroughs himself made many recordings over the years of excerpts from the book, many released on albums from Giorno Poetry Systems (GPS) and on Burroughs' later pseudo-musical albums Dead City Radio and Spare Ass Annie and Other Tales. 

A recording of Frank Zappa reading the book's "Talking Asshole" body horror vignette was made during the Nova Convention of 1979 and later included on the GPS soundtrack album of the event.

Footnotes

Bibliography

 Naked Lunch@50: Anniversary Essays, edited by Oliver Harris and Ian MacFadyen (Carbondale, Il: Southern Illinois University Press, 2009).

External links
 
The Boston Trial of Naked Lunch
Naked Lunch illustrations
Naked Lunch: the First Fifty Years An online exhibition at Columbia University, Rare Book & Manuscript Library

1959 American novels
American novels adapted into films
Beat novels
Censored books
Metafictional novels
Nonlinear narrative novels
Novels about drugs
Novels adapted into comics
Novels by William S. Burroughs
Novels set in Tangier
Obscenity controversies in literature
Olympia Press books
Postmodern novels